Segesterone acetate (SGA), sold under the brand names Nestorone, Elcometrine, and Annovera, is a progestin medication which is used in birth control and in the treatment of endometriosis in the United States, Brazil, and other South American countries. It is available both alone and in combination with an estrogen. It is not effective by mouth and must be given by other routes, most typically as a vaginal ring or implant that is placed into fat.

Side effects of SGA are similar to those of other progestins. SGA is a progestin, or a synthetic progestogen, and hence is an agonist of the progesterone receptor, the biological target of progestogens like progesterone. It has some affinity for the glucocorticoid receptor and has no other important hormonal activity.

SGA was developed by the Population Council and was introduced for medical use by 2000. It is under development in the United States and Europe as a gel in combination with estradiol or testosterone for use as a method of birth control in women and in men, respectively. On August 10, 2018, a first-of-its-kind one-year contraceptive vaginal ring containing segesterone acetate in combination with ethinyl estradiol was approved in the United States. It is marketed under the brand name Annovera and is reusable for up to one year as a method of birth control in women. Annovera does not require refrigeration which is very useful for low resource areas.

Medical uses
SGA is used as a hormonal contraceptive and in the treatment of endometriosis.

Available forms

Side effects

Side effects of SGA are similar to those of other progestins.

Pharmacology

Pharmacodynamics
SGA acts primarily as a high-affinity agonist of the progesterone receptor (272% of the affinity of progesterone and 136% of that of promegestone). It does not bind significantly to the androgen receptor, estrogen receptor, or mineralocorticoid receptor. As such, SGA does not have estrogenic, androgenic, antiandrogenic, or antimineralocorticoid activity. However, SGA does have significant affinity for the glucocorticoid receptor (38% of that of dexamethasone), but in spite of its relatively high affinity for the glucocorticoid receptor, it either does not have any glucocorticoid effects or shows glucocorticoid effects only at exceptionally high doses in animals. SGA has no antiglucocorticoid activity in animals either. The ovulation-inhibiting dosage of parenteral SGA has been reported to be 150 μg per day, while the endometrial transformation dosage has been reported to be 600 μg per cycle. SGA has antigonadotropic effects and functional antiestrogenic effects via its progestogenic activity similarly to other progestogens. In healthy young men, SGA alone at a dose of 2 to 3 mg/day as a transdermal gel (delivering 200–300 μg/day SGA) for 2 weeks suppressed testosterone levels from ~581 ng/dL to ~276 ng/dL (–52%).

Pharmacokinetics
SGA is only weakly active orally, and is instead given as a subcutaneous implant. The oral bioavailability of SGA has been reported to be only 10%. However, it has also been reported that the medication is more than 100-fold as potent when delivered via subcutaneous implant relative to oral administration in rats. It has been estimated that SGA administered at a dose of 2 to 3mg/day in the form of a transdermal gel delivers approximately 200 to 300μg/day SGA based on a transdermal bioavailability of about 10 to 12%. SGA is bound to albumin. It does not bind to sex hormone-binding globulin. Segesterone, the deacetylated form of SGA, is a metabolite of the medication. The biological half-life of parenteral SGA has been reported to be 24 to 72 hours. One study specifically reported a biological half-life of 26.8 hours. It has been reported that the biological half-life of SGA with oral administration is only 1 to 2 hours. In contrast to all of the preceding however, the Food and Drug Administration (FDA) label for Annovera, a one-year vaginal ring containing ethinylestradiol and SGA, lists a circulating half-life of SGA of 4.5 hours.

Chemistry

SGA, also known as 16-methylene-17α-acetoxy-19-norprogesterone or as 16-methylene-17α-acetoxy-19-norpregn-4-ene-3,20-dione, is a synthetic norpregnane steroid and a derivative of progesterone. It is a combined derivative of 17α-hydroxyprogesterone and 19-norprogesterone, or a derivative of gestronol (17α-hydroxy-19-norprogesterone). The medication is the C17α acetate ester of segesterone, which, in contrast, was never marketed. Other 19-norprogesterone derivatives include demegestone, gestonorone caproate (norhydroxyprogesterone caproate), nomegestrol acetate, promegestone, and trimegestone. SGA is a derivative of 16-methylene-17α-hydroxyprogesterone acetate, and is the analogue of methenmadinone acetate without the C19 methyl group or the C6 double bond. A derivative of SGA with even greater progestogenic potency in comparison to SGA is 18-methylsegesterone acetate.

History
SGA was developed by the Population Council. It has been marketed since at least 2000.

Society and culture

Generic names
Segesterone acetate is the generic name of the drug and its . It is also known by its brand names nestorone and elcometrine, as well as by its former developmental code names ST-1435, AC-6844, and CS-0411.

Brand names
SGA is marketed alone under the brand names Nestorone and Elcometrine and in combination with ethinylestradiol under the brand name Annovera.

Availability
SGA is available alone in several South American countries, including Brazil. It is available in the United States as a contraceptive vaginal ring in combination with ethinylestradiol.

Research
A combination of SGA and the estrogen estradiol is under development in a transdermal gel formulation for use as a contraceptive in women by the Population Council in conjunction with Antares Pharma in the United States and Europe. As of December 2017, it is in phase III clinical trials for this indication. The medication has the tentative brand name NestraGel. A combination of SGA and the estrogen ethinylestradiol in a vaginal ring formulation for use as a one-year contraceptive was developed by the Population Council in multiple regions including Latin America, Europe, and Australia.

A combination of SGA and the androgen testosterone is under development as a transdermal gel formulation for use as a hormonal contraceptive in men by the Population Council. As of December 2017, it is in phase II clinical studies for this purpose. In a trial, 100 couples used segesterone/testosterone dermal gel as the sole contraception method, which resulted in no pregnancy. Side effects were described as mild, comprising acne, weight gain and nocturnal sweating.

See also
 Ethinylestradiol/segesterone acetate

References

Acetate esters
Alkene derivatives
Contraception for males
Diketones
Hormonal contraception
Norpregnanes
Progestogen esters
Progestogens
Vinylidene compounds